The 2023 Rugby World Cup regional play-off and Final Qualification Tournament were the final two stages of the qualifying process for the 2023 Rugby World Cup. A cross-regional play-off match determined the Asia/Pacific play-off winner berth, after which a global repechage tournament between four teams (Africa 2, Americas 3, Europe 3 and the loser of the Asia/Pacific play-off) decided the twentieth and final team qualifying for the 2023 Rugby World Cup.

Tonga and Portugal secured the last two berths by winning respectively the Asia/Pacific play-off and Final Qualification Tournament.

Format

Asia/Pacific play-off
This match will be a single leg qualification match between Asia 1 (the winner of the Asian qualification process) and Oceania 2 (the winner of Round 3 in the Oceania qualification process). The winner of this play-off qualifies for the World Cup as Asia/Pacific Play-off winner and join Pool B, whilst the loser advances to the Final Qualification Tournament.

Final Qualification Tournament 
The Final Qualification Tournament will be contested as a four-team round-robin tournament and hosted at a neutral venue in Dubai, replicating the process first introduced for the 2019 Rugby World Cup. The participating teams include the runner-up of the African qualification round 3 (Africa 2), the losing side of the Americas 2 qualifier (Americas 3), the third-ranked side of the Europe qualification (Europe 3), and the loser of the Asia/Oceania play-off (Asia 1 or Oceania 2). The winner will qualify for the 2023 Rugby World Cup and will join Pool C.

Teams
Five teams progressed to the regional play-off and Final Qualification Tournament stages for the final two non-regional seeds in the World Cup. World rankings are as per date progressing to the play-off phase.

Asia/Pacific play-off

Notes:
 This was the first meeting between the two sides.

Final Qualification Tournament

Fixtures

Round 1

Notes:
 Cory Daniel, Viliami Helu, Jack Iscaro, Ryan Rees, Nathan Sylvia and Mitch Wilson (all United States) made their international debuts.
 This was the first meeting between these two nations.

Notes:
 Sean Taylor (Hong Kong) made his international debut.
 This was Portugal's first victory over Hong Kong.
 No replacement was issued for João Granate.

Round 2

Notes:
 Nickolas Cumming (Hong Kong) made his international debut.

Round 3

Notes:
 José Lima (Portugal) earned his 50th test cap.
 This was the first draw between these two sides.
 With this result, Portugal qualify for the World Cup for the first time since 2007.
 With this result, USA miss the World Cup for the first time since 1995.

References

2023 Rugby World Cup qualification
Rugby World Cup repechage qualifiers
2022 rugby union tournaments for national teams
Rugby World Cup
Rugby World Cup